Datuk Ali anak Biju (born 27 January 1968) is a Malaysian politician who has served as the Member of Parliament (MP) for Saratok since May 2018. He served as the Deputy Minister of Energy and Natural Resources for the second term in the Barisan Nasional (BN) administration under former Prime Minister Ismail Sabri Yaakob and former Minister Takiyuddin Hassan from August 2021 to the collapse of the BN administration in November 2022 and the first term in the Perikatan Nasional (PN) administration under former Prime Minister Muhyiddin Yassin and former Minister Shamsul Anuar Nasarah from March 2020 to the collapse of the PN administration in August 2021, Member of the Sarawak State Legislative Assembly (MLA) for Krian from April 2011 to December 2021. He is a member of the Malaysian United Indigenous Party (BERSATU), a component party of the PN coalition and was a member of the People's Justice Party (PKR), a component party of the Pakatan Harapan (PH) coalition. He also served as the Vice President of PKR from December 2018 to his resignation from the party in February 2020. He took part in the Sheraton Move, a successful attempt to overthrow PH administration and serves as a member of the Federal-State Relations Select Committee.

Education
Ali completed his high school education in Datu Patinggi Abang Haji Abdillah College. In 1992, he graduated from the Valparaiso University with a Bachelor of Science in civil engineering.

Personal life
Ali is currently active in the oil and gas industry as part of his civil engineering profession also director of Kumus Sdn. Bhd.

Election results

Honour
  :
  Knight Commander of the Order of the Territorial Crown (PMW) – Datuk (2021)

See also
 Saratok (federal constituency)
 Krian (state constituency)

References

Living people
Members of the Dewan Rakyat
Members of the Sarawak State Legislative Assembly
21st-century Malaysian politicians
Sarawak politicians
People from Sarawak
People from Betong Division
Former People's Justice Party (Malaysia) politicians
Malaysian United Indigenous Party politicians
Valparaiso University alumni
1968 births